Sijawal Junejo is a taluka of Qambar Shahdadkot District, division Larkana, Province of Sindh, Pakistan. It was established in 2004 when district Qambar Shahdadkot District was newly established. Sijawal Old Name was Sujawal Taluka. At the time of British Government Sujawal was taluka from approximately 1876 to 1915 A.D. Later on Sujawal name was changed to Sijawal Junejo in 2000 A.D. Name was suggested by U.C Nazim of that time.

Sijawal Junejo is situated on main Motorway Ratodero- Gwadar Road. It is situated in the center of Ratodero Taluka and shahdadkot. Sijawal Junejo City is 19 km away from Shahdadkot City and 18 km away from Ratodero City. The city is connected by road directly Shahdadkot Ratodero, Mirokhan, Qamber and Larkana District Cities.

Many people from different caste backgrounds live in the city including Magsi, Bhatti, Jamali, Gadhi, Syed, Brohi, Lohar, Isran, Junejo and Memon. There are many villages in its surroundings, such as Soharo Bhatti, Sir Shahnawaz Bhutto, Tharri.

Sijawal Junejo taluka has six Union Councils:
 UC: Sijawal
 UC: Arzi Bhutto
 UC: Dingano Mahesar
 UC: Hyder Chandio.
 UC: Mastoi
 UC: Thoof Chousool

History 
The taluka was upgraded from UC to taluka in December 2004 and Split From Mirokhan taluka before upgradation Sijawal was UC of Mirokhan taluka. According to census 2017 total population of talka is 117,459.

Political history General Election 
Sijawal Junejo is home town of Pakistan Peoples Party. Former Prime Minister of Pakistan Zulfiqar Ali Bhutto and Benazir Bhutto were elected from Sijawal NA.207.

From Sijawal 1 M.N.A and 2 M.P.A's are elected:

Elected candidate (2002-2007)

NA 207: Shahid Hussain Bhutto (PPPP)

PS 38: Haji Munawar Ali Abbasi (PPPP)

PS 40: Sultan Ahmed Khuhawar (Independent)

Elected candidate (2008-2013)

NA 207: Madam Faryal Talpur (PPPP)

PS 38: Haji Munawar Ali Abbasi (PPPP)

PS 40: Mir Nadir Ali Khan Magsi (PPPP)

Elected candidate (2013-2018)

Na 207: Madam Faryal Talpur (PPPP)

PS 38: Khurshed Ahmed Junejo (PPPP)

PS 40: Mir Nadir Ali Khan Magsi (PPPP)

Elected candidate (2018-till)

NA 202: Aftab Shahban Mirani (PPPP)

PS 14: Mir Nadir Ali Khan Magsi (PPPP)

PS 15: Ghanwer Ali Khan Isran (PPPP)

Political History Local Government 
UC Nazim (2000-2004): Mir Manzoor Ahmed Magsi (PPPP)

Taluka Nazim(2005-2009): Mir Manzoor Ahmed Magsi (PPPP)

UC Nazim (2005-2009): Syed Deedar Ali Shah (PML-Q)

UC Chairman (2015-2020): Raja Khan Bhatti (PPPP)

District Council Member (2015-2020): Mir Manzoor Ahmed Magsi

Geography 
Sijawal Junejo shares its borders with talukas Ratodero, Mirokhan, Shahdadkot, Gari Khero. Sijawal Junejo is situated at Latitude 27'50'30 (2750'30"N) and Longitude 68,06'50 (686'50.000"E). It is situated in North-western Sindh. Sijawal Weather is hot in Summer.

Education 
Sijawal Junejo city has Government and private schools. In Sijawal city Education is available til High School.

Health 
Government Health Center is not available at Sijawal City. Taluka Hospital is in under construction.

Economy 
Sijawal Junejo is surrounded by a fertile land, where mainly rice and wheat, including Watermelon, Potatoes, etc. are also cultivated.

Demographics 
The majority of the population of both the town and & the taluka of Sijawal Junejo speak the native Sindhi language. Urdu and English are also widely spoken and understood. Saraiki, Balochi, Punjabi and Brahui are also spoken in the city.

Transport 
Sijawal Junejo is connected via vans run most towns in the surroundings, including Larkana, Shahdadkot, Ratodero, Mirokhan and Qambar. Passenger buses run between Sijawal Junejo and Karachi, Hyderabad, Sukkur.

See also
 Larkana District
 Qambar Shahdadkot District 
 Ratodero Taluka
 Mirokhan
 Shahdadkot
 Zulfiqar Ali Bhutto
 Benazir Bhutto
 Mir Nadir Ali Khan Magsi
 Madam Faryal Talpur
Khurshed Ahmed Junejo
Ghanwer Ali Khan Isran
Aftab Shahban Mirani

References 

Populated places in Qambar Shahdadkot District